George Palmer may refer to:

Politicians
George Palmer (MP for South Essex) (1772–1853), English businessman, politician, and philanthropist
George Hastings Palmer (1881–1947), politician of Manitoba, Canada
George Palmer (British Army officer) (1857–1932), British Conservative Party politician
George M. Palmer (1857–?), New York politician
George William Palmer (British politician) (1851–1913), politician
George William Palmer (New York politician) (1818–1916), politician
George W. Palmer (Virginia politician) (1894–1972), Democratic State Senator from Virginia

Sportsmen
George Palmer (rugby league) rugby league footballer of the 1950s, for Batley and England
George Palmer (Australian cricketer) (1903–1986), Australian cricketer
George Palmer (Warwickshire cricketer) (1897–1962), English cricketer, played for Warwickshire in 1928
George Palmer (Leicestershire cricketer) (1917–2012), English cricketer, played for Leicestershire and South Australia
George Palmer (Australian footballer) (1879–1956), Australian rules footballer
Joey Palmer (George Eugene Palmer, 1859–1910), Australian Test cricketer

Others
George Palmer (bushranger) (c. 1846–1869), Australian bushranger
George Palmer (businessman) (1818–1897), Quaker entrepreneur and biscuit manufacturer of Reading, England
George Palmer (colour theorist) (c. 1746–1826), English dye chemist, color theorist, inventor, and soldier
George Palmer (EastEnders), fictional character in the BBC soap opera EastEnders
George Palmer (composer) (born 1947), Australian classical composer and judge of the NSW Supreme Court
George A. Palmer (1895–1981), American clergyman and broadcaster
George Henry Palmer (1840–1901), bugler during the American Civil War
George Herbert Palmer (1842–1933), American author and philosopher
George Josiah Palmer (1828–1892), founder of Church Times
George Palmer (lieutenant colonel), South Australian colonisation commissioner, son of George Palmer, MP for South Essex, above